Elections to Sheffield City Council were held on 4 May 2000. One third of the council was up for election. Previous to this election, two Liberal Democrats – Robert Watson and Trefor Morgan – became Independents. Similarly there were two Labour defections, long-time Labour councillor Dorothy Walton went to the Liberal Democrats and Michael Smith became an Independent.

The election saw the Liberal Democrats extend their majority through a couple of gains from Labour, with both parties recouping seats where aforementioned defections had taken place. Vote wise, the Liberal Democrat vote notably fell back from their previous elections' consistent increases, whereas the Conservatives managed their best vote share since 1992. Overall turnout was 25.8%.

Election result

This result has the following consequences for the total number of seats on the Council after the elections:

Ward results

Angela Smith was a sitting councillor for Broomhill ward

Jan Wilson was a sitting councillor for Intake ward

Dorothy Walton was previously elected as a Labour councillor

The Liberal Democrats had gained the Park seat in a by-election
Steve Barnard was a sitting councillor for Darnall ward

By-elections between 2000 and 2002

References

2000 English local elections
2000
2000s in Sheffield